Damulog, officially the Municipality of Damulog, is a 4th class municipality in the province of Bukidnon, Philippines. According to the 2020 census, it has a population of 39,322 people.

History

Historically, the first settlers of Damulog were the Manobos.  They are the indigenous people of the place. Testimonials of the old folks disclosed that the name of the place was “Ramulog” meaning a place to take a bath. A river at the town proper is a place where the Manobos take a bath. It also became a place of gathering where the men were fishing nearby, their wives washed clothes and the children are either swimming or gathering shells. Over time, “Ramulog” changed to “Damulog” due to assimilation of the Manobos and the new settlers. The river is now called Damulog River.

The opening of the Sayre Highway in 1953 opened Damulog into external trade. Manobos and Muslims from nearby Cotabato gathered abaca from the forests and sell it to the traders. The traders processed the abaca into raw fiber and resell it in Cagayan de Oro process these into fiber. More immigrants from the Visayas came and started to acquire farm lots. Slowly, the new settlers soon dominated trade and business.

Damulog celebrates its Araw ng Damulog every 16th day of August with exhilarating activities that comprehends every walk of life. The municipality celebrates its town fiesta every 7th day of October of the year in honor of Our Lady of the Holy Rosary. In line are different activities that draw many expectators from other municipalities and neighboring towns.

Political development

Damulog once a barrio of Kibawe was officially created a regular Municipality in January 1972 pursuant to Republic Act No. 6369. The author was Congressman Cesar "Titang" Fortich. The approval was on August 16, 1971, and Damulog started as municipality in 1972. Presently, the municipality has seventeen (17) regular barangays, namely: Aludas, Angga-an, Kinapat, Kiraon, Kitingting, Lagandang, Macapari, Maican, Migcawayan, New Compostela, Old Damulog, Omonay, Poblacion, Pocopoco, Sampagar, San Isidro, and Tangkulan.

It is difficult to trace the political lineage who handled the reins of power prior to the creation of the barrio of Damulog into a municipality. The kapitan del barrio then was Tito C. Balangyao who assumed as mayor upon its creation as a municipality in 1972. He remained mayor until March 1980 when Emiterio D. Luis won the mayoralty election. At the height of the EDSA People Power revolution, Corazon C. Aquino toppled President Ferdinand E. Marcos and subsequently, Mr. Luis was replaced by Erlito Bagas who was appointed as Officer-In-Charge (OIC) in the Office of the Mayor. After about two months, Rev. Romeo P. Tiongco assumed as mayor. He relinquished his post a year after wherein then Vice Mayor Basilio Beltran assumed the top post.

In 1992 election, Emiterio D. Luis again won the mayoralty post. It was during his term that RA 7160 known as the Local Government Code of 1991 was implemented. It was also this time that local governance became multidisciplinary and multifaceted. He finished his three terms in 1998.

In July 1998, the first lady chief executive was elected. She was then Josefina G. Tero who served a one-term office. She was succeeded by Fortunato E. Gudito, a retired military intelligence officer, who won the May 2001 local election. He served two terms.

In the May 2007 elections, Romeo P. Tiongco contested Gudito and won and is serving now as the incumbent mayor of the municipality of Damulog.

Geography

Barangays
Damulog is politically subdivided into 17 barangays.

Climate

Demographics

Economy

Infrastructure

Transportation
Damulog is accessible by land transportation. The existing land transportation in the city consists of multicabs from nearby towns, single motorcycles, buses from Cagayan de Oro and General Santos, tricycles, and private vehicles facilitate the movement of people and goods to and from all places in the town. Traveling from Poblacion is mainly by land through all kinds of vehicles.

Damulog is traversed by Sayre Highway. This is from barangay Sampagar in the north to Old Damulog, Poblacion, Pocopoco, Macapari to Omonay in the south. There is concrete road from Poblacion to Kinapat, then all-weather road from Kinapat to Kiraon, then again concrete from Kiraon to Old Damulog forming a complete loop with the Sayre Highway. Another loo is the Sayre Highway in Pocopoco to Kinapat to Poblacion. The third loop is the Poblacion to Doncilyon to Old Damulog.

Most of these roads were built with grants from Asian Development Bank under the ARC Program. The Poblacion to Kinapat concrete road is also a part of the program.

Barangays Old Damulog and Macapari has covered courts. All 17 barangays have their respective office building, health center, Tanod outpost and complete school buildings.

Water
To focus on other development concern, the local government spun off its water service creating the Damulog Water System. The spinning-off was a part of the grant in 2013 from the SALINTUBIG program of the Department of Health. Before 2013, the water system provides running water for 2 hours every 2 days. Water was so scarce that water cannot reached households away from the transmission line. The new system now provides 24 hour service which is managed by the water district.

Utilities
17 Barangays enjoy electricity supplied by the First Bukidnon Electric Cooperative or popularly known in the town as FIBECO. All barangays have either Level 2 or Level 3 water system.

Communication
Mobile services are primarily offered by Smart Communications, Globe Telecom, and Sun Cellular. Internet services are also offered by Sun Cellular, Smart Communications, and Globe Telecom in 3G and LTE or 4G technology.

Education
All barangays have complete elementary schools. Day Care centers are also present in barangays and sitios where there is considerable number of children. Secondary schools include the Old Damulog NHS, the swanky Macapari NHS, the private Xavier de Damulog HS and Kitingting Laguna Academy in barangay Kitingting.

Within Damulog and its periphery, the Korea-based Join Together Society built 34 school buildings with 2-classroom each. Locations are really remote areas providing precious education to children. This is also part of the peace-building effort of the local government promoting co-existence to Lumad, Muslims and Christians.

Notable people
Melino Buro, Municipal Mayor

References

External links
 [ Philippine Standard Geographic Code]
Philippine Census Information

Municipalities of Bukidnon
Populated places on the Rio Grande de Mindanao